, also known as the Taishō 14 machine gun, was a Japanese air-cooled heavy machine gun.

Design
The Type 3 heavy machine gun was based on the design of the Hotchkiss M1914. Although the Hotchkiss used 8mm cartridges, from 1914 Japan produced the Type 3 under license from Hotchkiss using the 6.5x50mm Arisaka ammunition.

It used an ammo strip for loading rounds. Its tripod could be used as an anti-aircraft mounting, and special anti-aircraft sights were provided.

Users
 : Chile bought several hundred Type 3 machine guns in 7×57mm Mauser as Modelo 1920. Barrels were manufactured in France by Hotchkiss but most of the weapon was made at the Kokura arsenal.
 : Purchased for Chang Tso-lin's Fengtian Army. Later used by the Collaborationist Chinese Army
 

 : It was used by the Korean People's Army during the Korean War.

Gallery

See also
Type 92 heavy machine gun
Type 1 heavy machine gun

Notes

Bibliography

External links
Japanese machineguns of WW2
 Catalog of Enemy Ordnance 

Heavy machine guns
Machine guns of Japan
World War I machine guns
World War I Japanese infantry weapons
World War II infantry weapons of Japan
World War II machine guns
Machine guns of Manchukuo
Weapons and ammunition introduced in 1914